= Vassacher See =

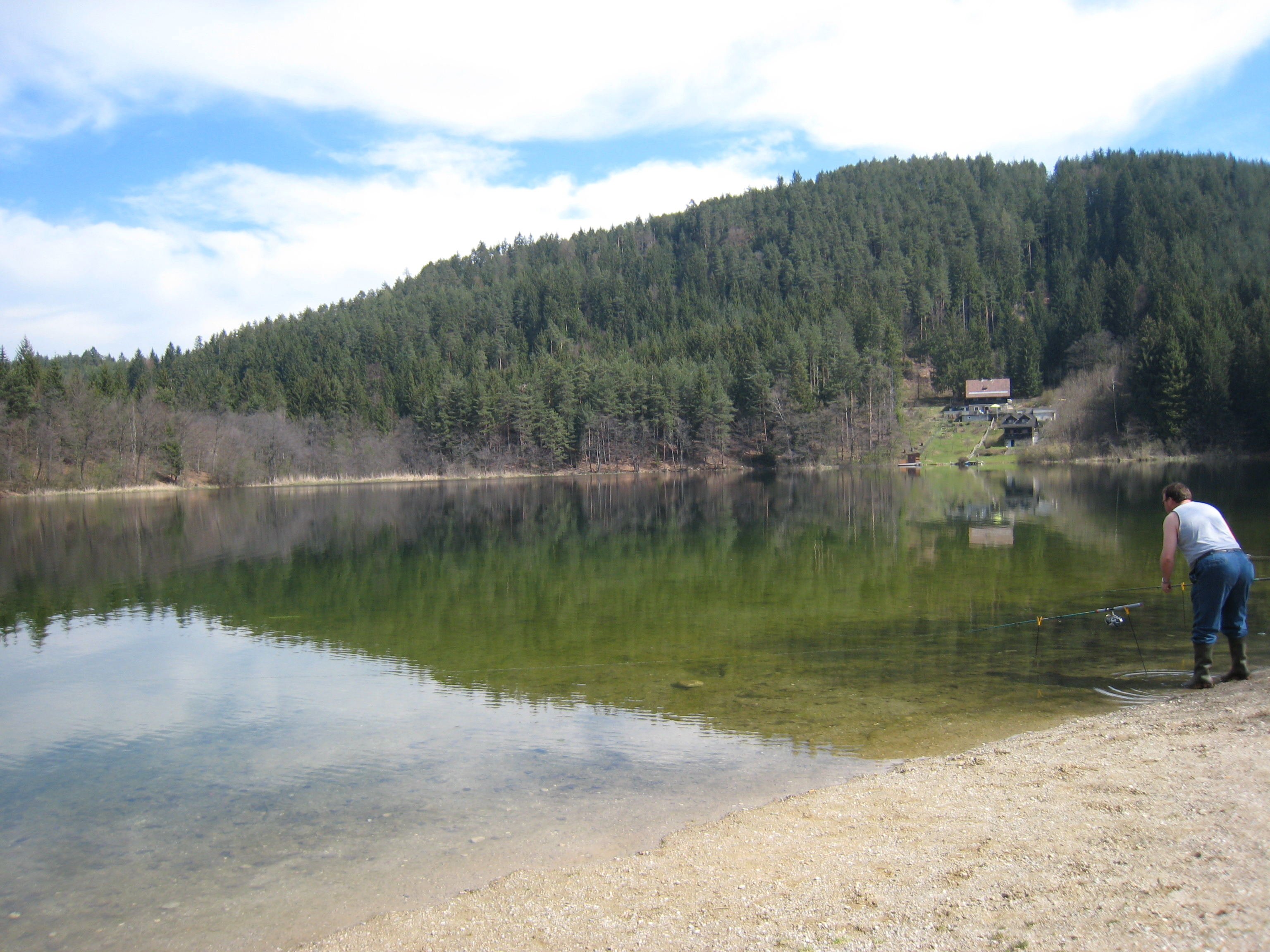
- Vassacher See

- Location within Austria
- Location: Villach, Austria
- Coordinates: 46°38′0″N 13°51′36″E
- Type: lake
- Surface area: 4.43 hectares (10.9 acres)
- Max. depth: 10.2 metres (33 ft)

Vassacher See is a small lake north of the Carinthian city of Villach, Austria. Its surface covers an area of 4.43 hectares (10.9 acres), its maximum depth is 10.2 metres (33 ft).
